The Lancia Aurelia is a car produced by Italian manufacturer Lancia from 1950 to the summer of 1958. It is noted for using one of the first series-production V6 engines.
Several body styles were offered: 4-door saloon, 2-door GT coupé (B20), 2-door spider/convertible (B24), and a chassis to be custom bodied by external coachbuilders.

Establishing a post-war Lancia tradition, the car was named after a Roman road: the Via Aurelia, leading from Rome to Pisa.

Specifications 

The Aurelia was designed under the direction of engineer Vittorio Jano. Its engine, one of the first production V6 engines, a 60° design developed by Francesco de Virgilio, who was between 1943 and 1948 a Lancia engineer, and who worked under Jano. During production, capacity grew from 1.8 L to 2.5 L. Prototype engines used a bore and stroke of 68 mm x 72 mm for 1,569 cc; these were tested between 1946 and 1948. It was an all-alloy pushrod design with a single camshaft between the cylinder banks. A hemispherical combustion chamber and in-line valves were used. A single Solex or Weber carburettor completed the engine. Some uprated 1,991 cc models were fitted with twin carburettors.

At the rear was an innovative combination transaxle with the gearbox, clutch, differential, and inboard-mounted drum brakes. The front suspension was a sliding pillar design, with rear semi-trailing arms replaced by a de Dion tube in the Fourth series. The Aurelia was also first car to be fitted with radial tires as standard equipment.
Initially 165SR400 Michelin X and later on the sports models fitted with 165HR400 Pirelli Cinturato.

B21 engine technical specifications
Bore: 72.00 mm.
Stroke: 81.50 mm.
Displacement: 1991 cc. 
Dry weight: 150 kg.
Firing order: 1L-4R-3L-6R-5L-2R.
Carburetors: Solex 30 AAI, 23 and 24mm venturis.
Power: 75 Gross HP @4500RPM.

History

First series 

The very first Aurelias were the B10 berlinas (sedans). They used a 1754 cc version of the V6 which produced . The B21 was released in 1951 with a larger 1991 cc  engine. A 2-door B20 GT coupé appeared that same year. It had a shorter wheelbase and a Ghia-designed, Pinin Farina-built body. The same 1991 cc engine produced  in the B20. In all, 500 first series Aurelias were produced.

Second series 

Other changes included better brakes and minor styling tweaks, such as chromed bumpers instead of the aluminium ones used in the earlier car. A new dashboard featured two larger instrument gauges. The suspension was unchanged from the first series.

Third series
The third series appeared in 1953 with a larger 2451 cc version of the engine. The rear of the car lost the tail fins of the earlier series.

Fourth series
The fourth series introduced the new de Dion tube rear suspension. The engine was changed from white metal bearings to shell bearings. An open car, the B24 Spider, was introduced at this time (1954 to 1955) and was well received. It was similar to the B20 coupé mechanically, with an 8-inch (203 mm) shorter wheelbase than the coupé.

The fourth series cars were the first Aurelias to be available in left-hand drive; fourth series Aurelias were the first ones to be imported to the US in any number.

This model was immortalized by Dino Risi's 1962 movie Il Sorpasso ("The Easy Life"), starring Vittorio Gassman. The actual car used for shooting (a single model) was not destroyed during the accident scene sealing the end of the story: an Alfa Romeo Giulietta Spider was used as replacement.

Fifth series
The fifth series coupé, appearing in 1956, was more luxury-oriented. It had a different transaxle (split case), which was more robust and similar to that used in the later Flaminias. The driveshaft was also revised to reduce vibration.

Alongside the fifth series coupés was a revised open car, the B24 convertible. This differed from the earlier B24 Spider, having roll-up windows, better seating position, and a windscreen with vent windows. In mechanical aspects, the B24 convertible was similar to the coupé of the same series.

Sixth series
The sixth series coupés had vent windows, and typically a chrome strip down the bonnet. They were the most touring oriented of the B20 series.

The sixth series B24 convertible was very similar to the fifth series, with some minor differences in trim. Most notably, the fuel tank was in the boot, not behind the seats as it was in the fourth and fifth series open cars. This change, however, did not apply for the first 150 sixth series cars, which were like the fifth series. The sixth series convertibles also featured different seats than either both earlier cars.

Models

Lancia Aurelia Spider (B24)
Produced only in 1954-1955, 240 cars were built. Panoramic front windscreen, distinctive 2 part chrome bumpers, removable side screens, soft top and Pinin Farina styling. 181 LHD cars with B24S ('sinistra') designation; the remaining 59 cars were right-hand drive. All were equipped with 2451 cc V6 engines. Built on a  wheelbase, the B24S Spider was mechanically similar to the 4th Series Aurelia B20, except for different air filters. All models had a floor-mounted gear-change. The dashboard featured one prominent and two small dials.

In 2014, RM Auctions sold a "barn find" 1955 Aurelia Spider at auction for £500,000 ($805,154 USD).
In 2014, Gooding and Company Auctions sold a restored 1955 Aurelia Spider for $1,815,000.

Lancia Aurelia Convertible (B24)
Produced from 1956, second series with many small alterations to the Aurelia Spider. It was mechanically based on the 5th series Aurelia B20. Cars from this series have a flatter windscreen with quarter-lights, deeper doors with external handles and wind-up windows. It also had one part chrome bumpers and a wider bonnet air-scoop. It had a proper convertible hood and a hardtop was available. 521 cars were built. The B24S Convertible was built on the same wheelbase as the Spider and used a slightly less powerful 2,451cc V6 engine. Dashboard features 2 big dials.

Lancia Aurelia Cabriolet (B50/B52) 

The first prototype of the B50 cabriolet was shown at the 1950 Turin Auto Show. Produced in small numbers, around 265 cars, by cabriolet-specialist Pinin Farina, the B50 Cabriolet was a four-seat comfortable cruiser. It is powered by a 1,754cc engine. The majority of the production was done between 1950-1952. Some cars had an improved B52 platform which came with the 2.0-litre engine of the B20/B21. In total Lancia built only 98 B52 chassis, the last of which was delivered in 1953.

Lancia Aurelia PF200 Spider 
The PF200 was a concept car that debuted on the Pinin Farina (as it was then) stand at the 1952 Turin Motor Show. The show car was built for promotional purposes to generate publicity and was never intended for series production, although Pinin Farina went on to build a further six examples, some open, some closed. The seven PF200s were slightly different from one another, although all featured the signature circular front air intake reminiscent of the North American F-86 Sabre jet fighter. The cars featured side air intakes and six exhaust pipes, while instead of stowing the soft-top behind the seats, like many open cars of the period, Pinin Farina arranged for the PF200's hood to fold down out of sight within the body. The PF200 used the chassis and running gear of the Lancia Aurelia B52.

Motorsport
In the 1951 Mille Miglia a 2-litre Aurelia, driven by Giovanni Bracco and Umberto Maglioli, finished second, beaten only by a Ferrari 340 America. The same year it took first in class and 12th overall at the 24 Hours of Le Mans. Modified Aurelias took the first three places in the 1952 Targa Florio with Felice Bonetto as the winner and another win on Lièges-Rome-Lièges of 1953. The fifth edition of the Coppa della Toscana netted 1-2-3 victory for the Lancia Aurelia GT 2500 of Scuderia Lancia.

One of the most important wins came in 1954 at the Monte Carlo Rally. An Aurelia GT co-driven by Louis Chiron and Ciro Basadonna took the top step of the podium, which was the first of Lancia’s many overall victories at the legendary rally held on the roads above the principality.

Production numbers

Notes
 not including one pre-production B24 prototype constructed in 1954

In popular culture
The Lancia Aurelia is featured prominently in The Calculus Affair, one of The Adventures of Tintin, in the story's car chase scene. The car's Italian driver has great pride in Italian cars, which he claims are the best in the world.

Dino Risi's 1962 movie The Easy Life (Il Sorpasso, starring Vittorio Gassmann and Jean-Louis Trintignant, a fine example of the Commedia all'italiana genre) features the Lancia Aurelia, one of the most iconic cars in Italian cinema. It was unusual at that time for a film to be filmed almost entirely in a car and The Easy Life can be considered one of the first road movies. The Lancia Aurelia used was a 1958 B24 Convertible and the driving scenes were very unusually filmed on the road rather than with a projected backdrop.

References

 
 
 
Lancia Aurelia at Lanciastory

External links

 Lancia Motor Club (UK)

Aurelia
Grand tourers
Rear-wheel-drive vehicles
Convertibles
Coupés
Sedans
1950s cars
Cars introduced in 1950
24 Hours of Le Mans race cars